Edwin Herman Lennette (September 11, 1908, Pittsburgh – October 1, 2000) was an American physician, virologist, and pioneer of diagnostic virology.

Biography
Lennette graduated from Pittsburgh's South Side High School in 1925. From 1925 to 1927 he was an undergraduate at the University of Chicago. In 1927, he dropped out because of economic necessity. From 1927 to 1929 he worked in the accounting department of a large chemical company in New York City. In the autumn of 1929 he resumed his undergraduate education as a junior in the University of Chicago's class of 1931. He graduated from the University of Chicago in 1931 with a B.S. and in 1935 with a Ph.D. His Ph.D. thesis on cellular immunity was supervised by N. Paul Hudson. Lennette received his M.D. in 1936 from Rush Medical College in 1936. He was a medical intern at Chicago's St. Luke's Hospital from July 1937 to July 1938. At the University of Chicago he was an instructor in bacteriology from 1936 to 1937 and a research associate from 1937 to 1938. At the Washington University School of Medicine in St. Louis he was an instructor in pathology from 1938 to 1939. From 1939 to 1946 he was a staff member of the Rockefeller Foundation's International Health Division. From 1941 to 1944 he was stationed in Brazil and did research on yellow fever and encephalitis viruses. From 1944 to 1946 he was assigned to the Rockefeller Foundation's Influenza Research Laboratory in Berkeley, California. There he did research on hepatitis and encephalitis and was one of the founding members of the USA's first civilian laboratory dedicated to diagnostic virology. For 18 months from 1946 to 1947, he was the chief of the U.S. Army's Medical-Veterniary Division in the Chemical Corps at Camp Detrick. In Berkeley, he was the director of the Viral and Rickettsial Disease Laboratory (VRDL) of the California Department of Public Health from 1947 to 1978, when he retired. At the VRDL, he was the successor to Monroe Eaton (1904–1958). The VRDL was founded in 1939 as the Influenza Research Laboratory.

Lennette's research on Q fever in the late 1940s and throughout the 1950s gained him an international reputation as a scientist and physician. He served as a consultant for several organizations, including the World Health Organization and the Department of the Army. In the 1940s, Lennette and Koprowski published important findings on the influences of murine age on several murine viral infections and on the effects of in vitro cultivation on the pathogencity in mice for the Venezuelan equine encephalitis virus (VEEV).

Lennette was elected in 1951 a fellow of the American Association for the Advancement of Science. He won several awards. He was the president of the American Association of Immunologists (AAI) for the academic year 1966–1967, the president of the Federation of American Societies for Experimental Biology (FASEB) for the academic year 1968–1969, and the president of the American Society for Microbiology (ASM) for the academic year 1978–1979.

In September 1930 he married Elizabeth Hubenthal (1907–1981). They had two sons.

Selected publications

Articles

Books
 Lennette, Edwin H., editor-in-chief, 
  (reprint of 1988 1st edition)

References

1908 births
2000 deaths
20th-century American physicians
American virologists
University of Chicago alumni
Rush Medical College alumni
American public health doctors
Rockefeller Foundation people
Fellows of the American Association for the Advancement of Science
People from Pittsburgh